Cătălin George Hîldan (3 February 1976 – 5 October 2000) was a Romanian professional footballer who played as a midfielder.

Club career

Cătălin Hîldan first came into contact with sports at the age of eight at the rugby club Olimpia together with his older brother Cristian. Two years later, in the summer of 1986, he joined football club Dinamo București along with Florentin Petre, Mihai Tararache and others. His first match for Dinamo was on 2 October 1994 in a Divizia A derby against Steaua București which ended with a 2–0 loss. After a couple of months he was loaned to Oțelul Târgoviște, where he helped the team win promotion to the second division and then to the first division. He was recalled to Dinamo by coach Cornel Dinu. In a couple of years he became the team's captain. In the 1999–2000 season, Hîldan played 29 league games in which he scored one goal, helping Dinamo win the league title for the first time in nine years, which was won mathematically after a 3–2 victory against Steaua, also in the same season, he scored the second goal of the 2–0 victory in the 2000 Cupa României final against Universitatea Craiova. He played a total of 138 matches in which he scored 6 goals in Divizia A, also appearing in 11 matches without scoring in European competitions.

International career
Cătălin Hîldan played 8 friendly games and scored one goal for Romania, making his debut on 3 March 1999 when coach Victor Pițurcă introduced him in the 85th minute to replace Gheorghe Popescu in a friendly which ended with a 2–0 victory against Estonia. He scored his only goal for the national team in a 1–1 against Georgia and played his last game on 3 June 2000 in a 2–1 victory against Greece. Hîldan was a part of Romania's squad at the Euro 2000 final tournament, but did not play.

International goals
Scores and results list Romania's goal tally first, score column indicates score after each Hîldan goal.

Death
Cătălin Hîldan died on 5 October 2000, while playing in a friendly match between Dinamo and Șantierul Naval Oltenița, having a stroke in the 74th minute of the game and fell to the ground. After his death he was nicknamed "The only captain" by Dinamo's fans and his number, 11, was retired by Dinamo in his honor. The north stand of the Dinamo Stadium is named "Peluza Cătălin Hîldan" (Cătălin Hîldan Stand), in his honor, also the Stadionul Cătălin Hîldan from his native Brănești is named after him. In 2006, he was posthumously named one of the 100 Greatest Romanians in a nationwide poll.

Honours
Oțelul Târgoviște
Divizia B: 1995–96
Divizia C: 1994–95
Dinamo București
Divizia A: 1999–00
Cupa României: 1999–00

Notes

References

External links
Cătălin Hîldan from the BBC Euro 2000 information website

1976 births
2000 deaths
People from Ilfov County
Romanian footballers
Association football midfielders
Liga I players
Liga II players
Liga III players
FC Dinamo București players
FCM Târgoviște players
UEFA Euro 2000 players
Romania international footballers
Romania under-21 international footballers
Association football players who died while playing
Sport deaths in Romania